Somebody Loves Me is a 1952 American comedy-drama musical film starring Betty Hutton. "Spanning the colorful era that was born with the San Francisco earthquake and ended with the stock market crash," the story focuses on the careers of entertainers Blossom Seeley and Benny Fields.

Plot

Cast
 Betty Hutton as Blossom Seeley
 Ralph Meeker as Benny Fields
 Robert Keith as Sam Doyle
 Adele Jergens as Nola Beach
 Jack Benny as himself

References

External links

1952 films
1950s romantic musical films
American romantic musical films
Films with screenplays by Irving Brecher
Films directed by Irving Brecher
Paramount Pictures films
Films produced by William Perlberg
Films produced by George Seaton
1950s English-language films
1950s American films